English Township may refer to:

English Township, Jersey County, Illinois
English Township, Iowa County, Iowa